Weszło is a media and sports group founded in 2008 by Krzysztof Stanowski. At the beginning it was mainly involved in football, with time it expanded to other disciplines.

History
From the very beginning, the texts appearing on the website weszlo.com were written with a sharp tongue, and the anonymous authors did not spare any insults and blunt comments on their goals. The founder himself, Krzysztof Stanowski, did not appear until 2011 in the text "Well to what? I think it's high time to get to know each other" (Polish: No to co? Chyba najwyższy czas się poznać), since the text disappeared from the website years later.

Initially, the main topic of the website was Polish football. Over time, the range of texts was expanded to include interviews, announcements, descriptions of matches from many European leagues, or columns of famous people related to sport. Czesław Michniewicz and Paweł Zarzeczny wrote for Weszło. Currently, columns are written regularly by Krzysztof Stanowski, Jakub Olkiewicz, Leszek Milewski and Wojciech Kowalczyk.

Along with the development of the portal, Weszło began to add new entities to its family. In addition to the main portal weszlo.com, there is a section with betting tips. There is also the weszlo.fm internet radio, the KTS Weszło football club, junior.weszlo.com dealing with children's football, eweszlo.pl dealing with electronic sports, and kierunektokio.pl, the only subject of which are the 2020 Summer Olympics. The Weszło Travel website was also created, which organizes trips to matches of foreign teams.

KTS Weszło Warsaw

References 

Polish sport websites